George Alexander Graham Adamson MBE (3 February 1906 – 20 August 1989), also known as the Baba ya Simba ("Father of Lions" in Swahili), was a Kenyan wildlife conservationist and author. He and his wife, Joy, were depicted in the film Born Free and best-selling book with the same title, which is based on the true story of Elsa the Lioness, an orphaned lioness cub they had raised and later released into the wild. Several other films have been made based on the Adamsons' lives.

Life
George Alexander Graham Adamson was born 3 February 1906 in Etawah, India to English and Irish parents. He was educated at Dean Close School, Cheltenham, England and moved to work on his father's coffee plantations Kenya in 1924. After the death of his parents, he worked a series of jobs, which included time as a gold prospector, goat trader and professional safari hunter, before joining Kenya's wildlife department in 1938, working as game warden. Six years later, he married Friederike Victoria "Joy" Gessner. It was in 1956 that he raised the lioness cub, Elsa, who he helped to release into the wild and who became the subject of the 1966 feature film Born Free based on the book written by Joy.

Adamson retired as a Senior Wildlife Warden of the Northern Frontier District Province of Kenya (Meru National Park area) in 1961 and devoted himself to raising lions that could not look after themselves and training them to survive in the wild. In 1970, he moved to the Kora National Reserve in northern Kenya to continue the rehabilitation of captive or orphaned big cats for eventual reintroduction into the wild. George and Joy separated in 1970, but continued to spend Christmas holidays together until she was murdered on 3 January 1980.

Death
On 20 August 1989, George Adamson was murdered near his camp in Kora National Park, by Somali bandits, when he went to the rescue of his assistant and a young European tourist in the Kora National Park. He was 83 years old. George is buried in the Kora National Park next to his brother, Terrance and two lions named: Super Cub and Mugie, a lion released in Kora after George's death.

Film and television
Born Free (1966), based on the book of the same name by Joy Adamson about Elsa the Lioness, that was rehabilitated into the wild, but remained in a friendly relationship with the Adamsons. The film stars Virginia McKenna as Joy Adamson and Bill Travers as George Adamson. George Adamson served as Chief Technical Advisor.
The Lions Are Free (1967) is the true story of what happened to the lions Boy, Girl, Ugas, Mara, Henrietta and Little Elsa, and other lions which starred in Born Free. George Adamson rehabilitated many of these lions after Born Free was completed. It is a documentary-style film about George Adamson and his lions.
An Elephant Called Slowly (1969) is a travelogue featuring George Adamson, Bill Travers and Virginia McKenna.
Lord of the Lions...Adamson of Africa was filmed in the Kora Reserve in Kenya only months before George was murdered (about 53 minutes)
Living Free (1972) is the sequel to Born Free; it stars Nigel Davenport as George Adamson and Susan Hampshire as Joy Adamson.
Christian the Lion (1972) is a documentary of Christian the lion and his journey to George Adamson; it was written, produced and directed by Bill Travers and James Hill, the director of Born Free.
Born Free (1974 television series) is a loose adaptation starring Gary Collins and Diana Muldaur.
To Walk With Lions (1999), a feature film, starred Richard Harris as George Adamson.
"The Born Free Legacy" is a BBC documentary from 2010.
"Elsa's Legacy: The Born Free Story" is a Nature PBS documentary episode from 2011.

Bibliography
 Bwana Game: The Life Story of George Adamson, Collins & Harvill (April 1968), 
A Lifetime With Lions, Doubleday (1st ed. in the U.S.A.) (1968), ASIN B0006BQAZW
 My Pride and Joy: Autobiography, The Harvill Press (22 September 1986),

References

Further reading
Sandy Gall, George Adamson: Lord of the Lions (Nov 1991), Grafton, 
Adrian House, The Great Safari: The Lives of George and Joy Adamson, (1993), William Morrow & Company,

External links
George Adamson Website featuring photos, letters and much information on George Adamson.
George Adamson Wildlife Preservation Trust
Profile of Joy & George Adamson
Animated website for kids. Meet Dotty Rhino & her friends who live in Mkomazi, a real-life game reserve in Africa.
WildLifeNow – African Wildlife Preservation Trust website
Born Free Foundation website
Gary Hodges Wildlife Art – drawing of George Adamson with Boy and Christian by artist Gary Hodges for George's memorial service.
Christian the Lion, Ace Bourke & John Rendall

1906 births
1989 deaths
British memoirists
British naturalists
British non-fiction writers
British people murdered abroad
Deaths by firearm in Kenya
People educated at Dean Close School
People murdered in Kenya
Settlers of Kenya
British emigrants to Kenya
British male writers
White Kenyan people
1989 murders in Kenya
20th-century memoirists
20th-century naturalists
Male non-fiction writers